Hefei–Bengbu high-speed railway (or the Hefei–Bengbu section of the Beijing–Taipei high-speed rail corridor)  is a  high-speed rail line between Hefei and Bengbu in Anhui province.  It is a part of the future Jingfu line connecting Beijing and Fuzhou, Fujian.

Construction started in January 2009. The railway was opened on  October 16, 2012.

With the fastest (G-series) trains on the new line, the travel time from  Hefei to Beijing South railway station is only four hours. Besides the Hefei-Beijing trains, there is also direct service from Hefei to Qingdao, via Jinan and the Jiaozhou–Jinan high-speed railway.

The total estimated investment is 13.6 billion yuan. It is part of the Jingfu line connecting Beijing and Fuzhou, Fujian.

There are 8 stations along this line.

References

High-speed railway lines in China
Rail transport in Anhui
2012 establishments in China
Railway lines opened in 2012